The 1994–95 Honduran Liga Nacional season was the 29th edition of the Honduran Liga Nacional.  The format of the tournament remained the same as the previous season.  C.D. Victoria won the title after defeating Club Deportivo Olimpia in the finals.  Both teams qualified to the 1996 CONCACAF Champions' Cup.

1994-95 teams

 Broncos (promoted)
 Deportes Progreseño
 Marathón
 Motagua
 Olimpia
 Platense
 Real España
 Real Maya
 Victoria
 Vida

Regular season

Standings

Final round

Hexagonal

 Olimpia 1–1 Marathón on aggregated.  Olimpia won on Away goals rule.

 Victoria won 6–2 on aggregated.

 Real España won 4–3 on aggregated.

Triangular standings

Final

 Olimpia 1–1 Victoria on aggregated.  Victoria won on Away goals rule.

Top scorer
  Álex Geovanny Ávila (Motagua) with 14 goals

Squads

Known results

Round 1

Round 2

Round 3

Triangular

Unknown rounds

References

Liga Nacional de Fútbol Profesional de Honduras seasons
1994–95 in Honduran football
Honduras